Young black women of the Harlem Renaissance lived with uncertainty of their rights and their roles at a time in which women began to question their sexuality in fear of facing the scrutiny. The women of Harlem began questioning their equal rights and freedom of sexual expression. One occupation that flourished was prostitution. In the early 1900s, New York City thrived with prostitution. Amidst the artistic spectrum of the Harlem Renaissance, the occupation of prostitution created an underlying tension for African American women and their right to solicit their bodies for profit. Preceding World War One, American ideology of sexuality was restrained by religion and denial. Sex was a private matter and was deemed taboo outside of procreation. Idealized notions of the sexual union, however, made non-procreative sex lustful and demeaning. This way of thinking immediately pushes prostitution into the spectrum of being a sinful act and portraying the act in a demeaning manner.

Rise in occupation
Following the civil war, the city of Harlem thrived as African Americans brought artistic beauty and breathtaking literature to bring forth a renaissance. There was also an unprecedented amount of wealth generated from illicit occupations. Underneath the surface of professional creativity, underground professions such as drug dealing, bootlegging, gambling, and prostitution supplied the needs to those who were daring and eager enough to make quick money. The Mann Act of 1910 made transportation of women for prostitution illegal. Among the illegal scene, prostitution in Harlem was intermingled with the growing number of divorce raids. Black prostitutes were the poorest and cheapest prostitutes around the region of New York City. Obedient to the economic success of blacks, Harlem prostitutes charged white men more than black men for their services.

Investigation and arrest
During the roaring twenties, in the city of Harlem, prostitution was one of many major occupations deemed inappropriate and obscene. Black prostitutes of the Harlem Renaissance were examined over a course of time and were place on a political watch list. In 1928, the Committee of Fourteen examined the nightlife of Harlem. In doing so, the witch hunt for alcohol-selling establishments turned into an investigation of prostitution in Harlem. '''W.E.B. Dubois''', editor of the NAACP journal threw a curve ball at the investigation exclaiming that if there was going to be an examination of black prostitution, then there would have been a policing of interracial sociability that would promote segregation. These investigations had taken place because the committee's attempt to shut down black owned businesses. In the midst of the investigation prostitution was disregarded. Because of this, there is little history about prostitution during the Harlem Renaissance that doesn't pertain to arrest and the degradation of black prostitutes during this era. Beginning in the early 1920s, Black prostitutes were predominantly accused of committing the illegal act due to public indecency. Within the profession of prostitution, black workers were different form their white counterparts. Prostitution among blacks was more public and the act had taken place in areas such as; alleyways and cars. The economic status of blacks prostitutes enabled them the ability to perform in brothels and hotels.

Establishments
Brothels were upscale prostitution rings that charged high-end prices for the sex. You could find buffet flats in wealthy areas like Manhattan. Buffet flats were apartment complexes or businesses that housed 'normal operations' during the day. At night they were transformed into hot gambling spots, bars, and rooms for rent that admitted prostitution. Speakeasies were also hot spots for the illegal usage of alcohol and soliciting prostitutes. These places brought forth an unlimited amount of illegal acts, dismissing danger and the law. Saloons and cabarets were "orderly" establishments that prohibited black prostitution. More often, black prostitutes worked on the streets under police radar. The legal and illegally ran businesses provided a somewhat safe haven for black prostitutes. In many cases, the owners of the clubs charged prostitutes for rental space.

Location
Between 127th street and 135th street in Harlem lay the red light district. The red light district was poor and dirty. The police officers made most of their arrests there because the prostitutes there were most likely streetwalkers. The Tenderloin was the name of the red light district of New York City during the 19th and early 20th century. With the opening of a subway in 1904, Harlem integrated into the metropolis of the Tenderloin and became a hot spot for prostitution. In 1908, A.V. Morgenstern observed that the music and dance halls north of Central Park were "meeting" places of the professional prostitutes who took clients into numerous "transient hotels" nearby. Along seventh and Lennox avenue, prostitution was on more expensive because the area was rich and prostitution took place inside.

References

Harlem Renaissance
Prostitution in New York (state)
Harlem Renaissance